Since 1935, and annually since 1955, the Vuelta a España has been the most important multiday cycle racing event in Spain. In the 63 editions of the race, riders from eleven countries have won the general classification. A mountains classification has been held every edition too, while the first points classification was held in 1945 and annually since 1955. Madrid has staged the most Vuelta-starts and finishes, and has been the regular finish city since 1994.

By year

By rider

By country

Overall

Points

King of the Mountains

See also 
 List of Tour de France winners
 List of Giro d'Italia general classification winners
 Golden jersey statistics

References

Classification Winners
Lists of cyclists